The Faculty of Medicine, Prince of Songkla University is the sixth oldest medical school in Thailand located in Hat Yai District, Songkhla Province and is the fourth oldest faculty of Prince of Songkla University, opening in 1972 by royal decree.

History 
Due to a lack of medical and healthcare personnel in Thailand, as well as various healthcare issues in Southern Thailand, the council of Prince of Songkla University requested for the construction of a Faculty of Medicine on 11 September 1968. The project was approved on 17 August 1971 and construction began at the Hat Yai campus of the university. The first cohort of medical students was accepted in June 1973, consisting of 35 students. Teaching was done in the Faculty of Science for the preclinical years and Hatyai Hospital and Songkhla Hospital during the clinical years.

On 26 August 1976, King Bhumibol Adulyadej and Queen Sirikit laid the foundation for the construction of the faculty's main teaching hospital. Ten years later on 18 September 1986, the King and Princess Sirindhorn opened the hospital and named it 'Songklanagarind' Hospital. Songklanagarind Hospital has become the main teaching hospital since then.

Departments 
 Department of Anaethesiology
 Department of Biomedical Science
 Department of Community Medicine
 Department of Emergency Medicine
 Department of Internal Medicine
 Department of Obstetrics and Gynaecology
 Department of Ophthalmology
 Department of Orthopaedic Surgery and Physical Medicine
 Department of Otolaryngology
 Department of Pathology
 Department of Paediatrics
 Department of Physical Therapy
 Department of Psychology
 Department of Radiology
 Department of Surgery
 Department of Epidemiology

Education 
The following table displays the programs taught at the Faculty of Medicine at Prince of Songkla University.

Main Teaching Hospitals 
 Songklanagarind Hospital
 Hatyai Hospital (CPIRD), Songkhla Province
 Yala Hospital (CPIRD), Yala Province

Affiliated Teaching Hospitals 
 Trang Hospital, Trang Province
Songkhla Hospital, Songkhla Province
Maharaj Nakhon Si Thammarat Hospital, Nakhon Si Thammarat Province
Surat Thani Hospital, Surat Thani Province
Thung Song Hospital, Nakhon Si Thammarat Province

See also 
 List of medical schools in Thailand

References 

Article incorporates material from the corresponding article in the Thai Wikipedia.

Medical schools in Thailand
Songkhla province
University departments in Thailand